Computer-aided garden design describes the use of CAD packages to ease and improve the process of garden design.
Professional garden designers tend to use CAD packages designed for other professions. This includes architectural design software for the drafting of garden plans, 3-D software and image-editing software for visual representation. But tailor-made computer-aided design software is made for the amateur garden design market. It contains some of the functionality of the more advanced programs, packaged in an easy-to-use format.

See also
Garden design
Computer-aided design
List of CAD companies
Virtual home design software

References

Gardening aids